Ernest "Ernie" Pollard (fourth ¼ 1910 – death unknown) was an English professional rugby league footballer who played in the 1920s and 1930s. Ernie Pollard's career was ended in October 1938 when he suffered a severe knee injury.

Background
Ernie Pollard's birth was registered in Wakefield district, West Riding of Yorkshire, England.

Playing career

International honours
Ernie Pollard won caps for England while at Wakefield Trinity in 1932 against Wales (2 matches), and won caps for Great Britain while at Wakefield Trinity in 1932 against Australia (2 matches).

County honours
Ernie Pollard won cap(s) for Yorkshire while at Wakefield Trinity.

County Cup Final appearances
Ernie Pollard played left-, i.e. number 4, in Wakefield Trinity's 0–8 defeat by Leeds in the 1932 Yorkshire County Cup Final during the 1932–33 season at Fartown Ground, Huddersfield on Saturday 19 November 1932, right-, i.e. number 3, and scored a goal in the 5–5 draw with Leeds in the 1934 Yorkshire County Cup Final during the 1934–35 season at Crown Flatt, Dewsbury on Saturday 27 October 1934, played , and scored a goal in the 2–2 draw with Leeds in the 1934 Yorkshire County Cup Final replay during the 1934–35 season at Fartown Ground, Huddersfield on Wednesday 31 October 1934, and played left- in the 0–13 defeat by Leeds in the 1934 Yorkshire County Cup Final second replay during the 1934–35 season at Parkside, Hunslet on Wednesday 7 November 1934.

Club career
Ernie Pollard is the second youngest player to make his début for Wakefield Trinity aged 16-years and 4-months in 1927, the youngest player being Richard Goddard, he made his début for Wakefield Trinity during March 1927, he appears to have scored no drop-goals (or field-goals as they are currently known in Australasia), but prior to the 1974–75 season all goals, whether; conversions, penalties, or drop-goals, scored 2-points, consequently prior to this date drop-goals were often not explicitly documented, therefore '0' drop-goals may indicate drop-goals not recorded, rather than no drop-goals scored. In addition, prior to the 1949–50 season, the archaic field-goal was also still a valid means of scoring points.

Genealogical Information
Ernest Pollard's marriage to Dorothy (née Rayner) was registered during first ¼ 1933 in Wakefield district. They had children; the Wakefield RFC rugby union footballer from 1956 to 1958, Anthony Pollard (birth registered during third ¼ 1935 in Wakefield district). Ernest was the younger brother of the rugby league footballer Charles Pollard, and the older brother of the Wakefield Trinity  of the 1930s Lionel Pollard (birth registered during first ¼ 1913 in Wakefield district), Frank Pollard (birth registered during first ¼ 1914 in Wakefield district), Donald Pollard (birth registered during second ¼ 1916 in Wakefield district), and Wilfred Pollard (birth registered during second ¼ 1917 in Wakefield district), and was the uncle of the rugby league footballer, Roy Pollard, Oxford University RFC, Wakefield RFC, Colwyn Bay RFC and North Wales rugby (captain) rugby union footballer, David Pollard (birth registered during fourth ¼ 1929 in Wakefield district), and Barbara M. Pollard (birth registered during third ¼ 1932 in Wakefield district),

References

External links
Photograph "Ernest Pollard - Ernest Pollard formed a magnificent centre partnership with Tom Winnard in 1937/38. His career came to a halt in October 1938 when he suffered a severe knee injury. - Date: 01/01/1937" at rlhp.co.uk

1910 births
Bradford Bulls players
England national rugby league team players
English rugby league players
Great Britain national rugby league team players
Leeds Rhinos players
Place of death missing
Rugby league centres
Rugby league five-eighths
Rugby league players from Wakefield
Wakefield Trinity captains
Wakefield Trinity players
Yorkshire rugby league team players
Year of death missing